Thelma Young (born 8 September 1972) is a Paralympic swimmer from Great Britain.

Early life 

Young was born in Southampton with a congenital bi-lateral hemangioma.  It is visible on the skin of her right arm. She has bone and vascular problems also.

She learnt to swim at the age of 6 years at Eastleigh Leisure Centre, Southampton.  She then joined City of Southampton Swimming Club.

She was coached by father (William Young), Dave Heathcock (City of Southampton Swim Coach) and Mary Jenner (Les Autres GB Coach).

Sporting career 

Thelma joined the Les Autres GB squad in 1986 after competing in their national championships.

Her first international competition was the 1987 European Championships in Paris, France.  She won two gold, two silver and two bronze medals in the L6 class.

At the 1988 Seoul Games, she won two gold medals in the Women’s 4 × 100 m medley relay A-L and 4 × 100 m Freestyle relay A-L with Dianne Barr, Joanne Round and Linda Walters and two bronze medals in the Women’s 100 m Breaststroke L6 and Women’s 100 m Backstroke L6 events.[1,2,3,4]

At the 1989 World Youth Games in Miami, USA, she won four gold medals in the L6 class.

At her last international, she won one gold medal at the 1990 World Championships and Games for the Disabled in Assen, the Netherlands.

Thelma has a total of 15 international medals - 9 gold.

Young had to retire in 1991 due to ill health.

Personal life 

Since retiring, Thelma has completed a Bachelor of Science(Hons)Degree in Sport Science at the University of Portsmouth - 1995-1998.

She is currently involved with the Scout Association.

References 

1  http://www.paralympic.org/ipc_results/results.php?eclass=L6&sport=swimming&competition=1988PG&gender=f&discipline=&event=100%20m%20Backstroke

2  http://www.paralympic.org/ipc_results/results.php?eclass=L6&sport=swimming&competition=1988PG&gender=f&discipline=&event=100%20m%20Breaststroke

3  http://www.paralympiansclub.org.uk

4  Swimming at the 1988 Summer Paralympics

Paralympic swimmers of Great Britain
British female breaststroke swimmers
1972 births
Living people
Medalists at the 1988 Summer Paralympics
Swimmers at the 1988 Summer Paralympics
Paralympic gold medalists for Great Britain
Paralympic bronze medalists for Great Britain
Paralympic medalists in swimming
British female freestyle swimmers
British female backstroke swimmers